Glenn D. (Shorty) Broyles (June 27, 1926 – September 17, 2014), was an American politician in the state of Tennessee. Broyles served in the Tennessee House of Representatives from 1969 to 1972. A Republican, he represented Greene County, Tennessee and worked as a farm supply merchant. He lived in Chuckey, Tennessee. On September 17, 2014, he died at the age of 88 at Durham Hensley Nursing Home in Chuckey, TN and is buried at Philadelphia Cumberland Presbyterian Cemetery in Washington County.

References

1926 births
2014 deaths
Members of the Tennessee House of Representatives
People from Limestone, Tennessee